Filippo Mazzola (1460 - 1505) was an Italian painter of the Renaissance period.

He was born in Parma, his father was Bartholomew, and he became a pupil of Francesco Tacconi. He worked mainly in the area between Parma and Piacenza. There is documentation of a trip to Venice, where he is thought to have gone to study his main stylistic references: Antonello da Messina, Giovanni Bellini and Alvise Vivarini. His most notable work is the polyptych kept at the basilica of Cortemaggiore, although it is currently missing a couple of paintings. He was the father of the painter Girolamo Francesco Maria Mazzola. He died at the age of about 45 years, during an epidemic of plague.

References
 Roberto Lasagni, Biographical Dictionary of Parmigiani, ed. PPS, Parma 1999

1460 births
1505 deaths
15th-century Italian painters
Italian male painters
16th-century Italian painters
Painters from Parma